The 1971 Super Prestige Pernod was the thirteenth edition of the Super Prestige Pernod, a season-long competition for road bicycle racing. It included sixteen races in Europe. Belgian Eddy Merckx of the  team won the overall title.

Races

Final standings

References

 
Super Prestige Pernod
Super Prestige Pernod
1971 in European sport